Morchard Bishop is a village and civil parish in Mid Devon in the English county of Devon. It has a population of 975, and contains a primary school, two churches, and a playing field with tennis court. Notable past residents include Ernest Bevin.

The name Morchard means the great wood or forest from the Celtic: mǭr cę̃d, Modern Welsh: mawr coed. The affix of 'Bishop' is from its possession by the Bishop of Exeter in 1086.

Morchard Bishop is twinned with Saint-Gatien-des-Bois in Normandy. It has a garage, a post office, a pub called The London Inn, a surgery, a blacksmith and its own woodland. Community events include: a village pantomime, an allotment association, a ukulele band and football teams.

References

External links

Villages in Devon